Bolshaya Sosnova is a rural locality (a selo) and the administrative center of Bolshesosnovsky District of Perm Krai, Russia, located  southwest from Perm. Population:

History
It was first mentioned in 1716. In the 18th century, it was a postal station on the Siberian Route. In the 19th century, it was called Sosnovskoye. It became the administrative center of a district in 1924, and has since served in this capacity with a brief interruption between 1963 and 1968.

References

Rural localities in Bolshesosnovsky District